The Golden Age of Bulgaria is the period of the Bulgarian cultural prosperity during the reign of emperor Simeon I the Great (889—927). The term was coined by Spiridon Palauzov in the mid 19th century. During this period there was an increase of literature, writing, arts, architecture and liturgical reforms.

Simeon I achieved spectacular military and political successes, expanding Bulgarian territory and forcing the Byzantine Empire to recognise the imperial title of the Bulgarian monarchs. The capital Preslav was built in Byzantine fashion to rival Constantinople. Among the city's most remarkable edifices were the Round Church, also known as the Golden Church, and the imperial palace. At that time was created and painted Preslavian pottery, which followed the most prestigious Byzantine models. A chronicle of the 11th century testified that Simeon I had built Preslav for 28 years.

Simeon I gathered around himself the so-called Simeon's circle, that included some of the most prominent literary authors in medieval Bulgaria. Simeon I himself is alleged to have been active as a writer: works that are sometimes credited to him include Zlatostruy (Golden stream) and two of Simeon (Svetoslavian) collections (first in transcript of 1234, and the second - in 1299).

The most important genres were Christian edifying oratory eulogies, lives of saints, anthems and poetry, chronicles, and historical narratives. Remarkable works include Hexameron by John Exarch, Didactic Gospel (including the Alphabet prayer) by Constantine of Preslav, An Account of Letters by Chernorizets Hrabar. The names of the other authors of Simeon circuit were Tudor Dox, Prester John and Prester Gregory but none of their works are preserved. They were all venerating the liturgy in Old Bulgarian language and the Cyrillic script created in Bulgaria few years before the reign of Simeon I, during the reign of his father Boris I of Bulgaria. Clement of Ohrid and Naum of Preslav created (or rather compiled) the new alphabet which was called Cyrillic and was declared the official alphabet in Bulgaria in 893. The Old Bulgarian, also called Old Church Slavonic, language was declared as official in the same year. In the following centuries the liturgy in Bulgarian language and alphabet were adopted by many other Slavic peoples and counties.

See also

Pliska-Preslav culture
Christianization of Bulgaria
Cyrillic script
Early Cyrillic alphabet
First Bulgarian Empire
History of Bulgaria
Medieval Bulgarian literature
Ohrid Literary School
Preslav Literary School
Relationship of Cyrillic and Glagolitic scripts
Third Rome
Day of the Holy brothers Cyril and Methodius, of the Bulgarian alphabet, education and culture and of the Slavonic literature
Tarnovo Literary School
Art School of Tarnovo
Painting of the Tarnovo Artistic School
Architecture of the Tarnovo Artistic School

References

Literature

 Nikolov, A. The Perception of the Bulgarian Past in the Court of Preslav around 900 AD. - In: State and Church: Studies in Medieval Bulgaria and Byzantium. Ed. by V. Gjuzelev and K. Petkov. American Research Center in Sofia: Sofia, 2011, 157-171

 
Medieval culture
Medieval architecture
European civilizations